Guajira  is a Colombian telenovela produced by RCN Televisión in 1996.

Plot

Cast

Sonya Smith as Sonia Arbeláez (main heroine)
Guy Ecker as Helmut Heidenberg (main hero, Sonia's husband)
Rafael Novoa as Felipe Uribe
Carolina Sabino as Ursula Epieyu

Additional Cast:

Luis Fernando Ardila as Engineer David (1st)
Ismael Barrios as Meyo
Manuel Busquets as Engineer David (2nd)
Carlos Humberto Camacho
Rafael Cardoso as Alejo
Kika Child as Natalia
Myriam De Lourdes as Josefina
Constanza Duque as Marina de Arbeláez (Sonia's mother)
Julio Echeverri as Robert Fajardo
Alcira Gil as Edith
Marisela González as María
Yuldor Gutiérrez as Tulio
Eloísa Maestre as Lina María de Gómez
Edgardo Román as Avelino "El Cacique Ipuana"
Pilar Uribe as Cindy (Felipe's wife)
Herbert King as Rafael Pineda
Franky Linero as Tom
Lizeth Mahecha
Andrés Martínez
Carminia Martínez
Andrea Quejuán as Remedios
Germán Quintero as Roberto Gómez
Julián Román as Ramón
Jennifer Steffens as Anabel de Pugliese
Luis Tamayo as Cidro
Katherine Vélez as Mónica de Fajardo

International Broadcasters of Guajira

South América 

 : América 2
 : Red Guaraní

External links
Guajira in Internet Movie Database

1996 telenovelas
Colombian telenovelas
Spanish-language telenovelas
RCN Televisión telenovelas
1996 Colombian television series debuts
1997 Colombian television series endings
Television shows set in Bogotá